The 1830 United States Senate election in Pennsylvania was held on from December 14 to 16, 1830. William Wilkins was elected by the Pennsylvania General Assembly to the United States Senate.

Results
Incumbent National Republican William Marks, who was elected in 1825, was not a candidate for re-election to another term. The Pennsylvania General Assembly, consisting of the House of Representatives and the Senate, convened on December 14, 1830, to elect a new Senator to fill the term beginning on March 4, 1831. Twenty-one ballots were recorded over the next three days. The results of the twenty-first and final ballot of both houses combined are as follows:

|-
|-bgcolor="#EEEEEE"
| colspan="3" align="right" | Totals
| align="right" | 132
| align="right" | 100.00%
|}

References

External links
Pennsylvania Election Statistics: 1682-2006 from the Wilkes University Election Statistics Project

1830
Pennsylvania
United States Senate